Francis Stanley "Monk" Maznicki (July 19, 1920 – December 14, 2013) was an American football halfback who played three seasons with the Chicago Bears and Boston Yanks. He played college football at Boston College.

Personal life
Maznicki was born on July 19, 1920, in West Warwick, Rhode Island. He played high school football for West Warwick High School's team and quickly became a stand-out football player. He played college football for Boston College and was an All-American running back during his time there. His NFL career was interrupted by World War II and he served as a Navy pilot for three years before he returned to the Chicago Bears. After he retired from the NFL in 1947 he returned to West Warwick and became a long-time coach for the school's football team. He died in West Warwick on December 14, 2013, the year West Warwick won the state championship.

Professional career

Chicago Bears 
After a standout career at Boston College, Maznicki was drafted by the Chicago Bears in the 8th round of the 1942 NFL Draft. Maznicki played halfback, defensive back, and placekicker during his time with the Bears. In 1942, Maznicki made the Pro Bowl with the Bears and helped lead them to an 11–0 record. After he returned from his stint with the Navy, Maznicki returned to the Bears and won the 1946 NFL Championship Game.

Boston Yanks 
In 1947, Maznicki joined the Boston Yanks, and after that season he retired.

NFL career statistics

Regular season

Postseason

Legacy
West Warwick High School's football field is named in honor of Maznicki. He was inducted into the Boston College Varsity Club Hall of Fame in 1971. He was also inducted into the Rhode Island Heritage Hall of Fame in 1974.

References

External links

1920 births
2013 deaths
American football halfbacks
Boston College Eagles football players
Boston Yanks players
Chicago Bears players
Iowa Pre-Flight Seahawks football players
People from West Warwick, Rhode Island
Players of American football from Rhode Island
American people of Polish descent
West Warwick High School alumni